Pinar del Río won its second straight Cuban National Series. Perennial cellar-dwellers Guantánamo and Ciego de Ávila made the playoffs, where they were promptly swept in three games.

Standings

Group A

Group B

Group C

Group D

Playoffs

References

 (Note - text is printed in a white font on a white background, depending on browser used.)

Cuban National Series seasons
Base
Base
Cuba
1997 in baseball